Aaranyakaandam is a 1975 Indian Malayalam-language film, directed by J. Sasikumar and produced by R. S. Prabhu. The film stars Prem Nazir, Srividya, Sukumari and Adoor Bhasi. The film had musical score by A. T. Ummer.

Cast
 
Prem Nazir 
Srividya 
Sukumari 
Adoor Bhasi 
Thikkurissy Sukumaran Nair 
Sankaradi 
Sreelatha Namboothiri 
Kunchan 
M. G. Soman 
Meena 
Paravoor Bharathan 
Philomina 
S. P. Pillai 
Thrissur Rajan 
Usharani

Soundtrack
The music was composed by A. T. Ummer.

References

External links
 

1975 films
1970s Malayalam-language films